George W. Huber is the Harvey Spangler Professor of Chemical Engineering at the University of Wisconsin- Madison .  His research focus is on developing new catalytic processes for the production of renewable liquid fuels and chemicals.

Career
In 2015 Thomson Reuters has listed George  as a “highly cited researcher” which indicates that he is “one of the “world’s most influential scientific minds” who rank in the top 1% most cited.  He has authored over 100 peer-reviewed publications including three publications in Science and has over 10 patents.  He has received several awards including the NSF CAREER award, the Dreyfus Teacher-Scholar award, fellow of the Royal Society of Chemistry, and the outstanding young faculty award (2010) by the college of engineering at UMass-Amherst.  He has been named one of the top 100 people in bioenergy by Biofuels Digest for the past 4 years. He is co-founder of Anellotech (www.anellotech.com) a biochemical company focused on commercializing, catalytic fast pyrolysis, a technology to produce renewable aromatics from biomass. George serves on the editorial board of Energy and Environmental Science, ChemCatChem, Energy Technology, and The Catalyst Review.  In June 2007, he chaired a NSF and DOE funded workshop entitled: Breaking the Chemical and Engineering Barriers to Lignocellulosic Biofuels (www.ecs.umass.edu/biofuels).  In summer of 2015, George did a sabbatical visit with Professor Tao Zhang at Dalian Institute of Chemical Physics.  George did a post-doctoral stay with Avelino Corma at the Technical Chemical Institute at the Polytechnical University of Valencia, Spain (UPV-CSIC).  He obtained his Ph.D. in Chemical Engineering from University of Wisconsin-Madison (2005).  He obtained his B.S. (1999) and M.S.(2000) degrees in Chemical Engineering from Brigham Young University.
Huber is a Latter-day Saint.  The July 2009 issue of Scientific American included an article on the potential of grassoline by Huber and Bruce E. Dale.

Sources
NSF article on the work of Huber and others towards plant based fuel
UMass bio of Huber 
Huber's and Dale's Scientific American article
Mormon Times Dec. 2, 2009 article on Huber's work

American chemical engineers
Latter Day Saints from Wisconsin
Brigham Young University alumni
Living people
University of Wisconsin–Madison College of Engineering alumni
University of Massachusetts Amherst faculty
Latter Day Saints from Massachusetts
Latter Day Saints from California
1975 births